Breg railway station is the principal railway station serving Breg, Sevnica and Šentjur na Polju.

External links 
Official site of the Slovenian railways 

Railway stations in Slovenia